The Tale of Tsar Saltan is a 1966 fantasy film based on the eponymous 1831 tale by Alexander Pushkin, directed by Aleksandr Ptushko.

Plot
Three sisters are sitting by the window telling each other what they would do if the Tsar marries them. The first one would arrange a wedding banquet for all people, the second would dress everyone elegantly. The third and the youngest, however, says: "I would not give the Tsar money and goods, but instead a son with strength and courage."

The Tsar, who hears this conversation, takes the youngest woman as his wife. He places the other two as court cook and weaver. Envious of their youngest sister, the two join and come to the Tsar's court.

Some time later, the Tsar must go to war. His wife tells him in a letter that she gave birth to a son. The Tsar's reply is intercepted by the sisters and the mother-in-law and falsified to be so that the wife and son are sealed in a keg and thrown into the sea.

After a while they find themselves on a beach of a barren island. There the adult son rescues the life of a swan. This swan is an enchanted princess. She creates a beautiful city for the mother and son, whose inhabitants make him Prince Gwidon. The swan also helps Gwidon disguised as an insect to see his father.

Some time later, the Tsar – against the wish of the sisters – comes to this city and recognizes his wife and son again.

Cast
Vladimir Andreyev - Tsar Saltan
Larisa Golubkina - Queen
Oleg Vidov - Prince Gvidon
Ksenia Ryabinkina - Princess Swan (voiced by Nina Gulyaeva)
Sergey Martinson - guardian of Saltan
Olga Viklandt - mother-in-law (credited as "O. Viklandt")
Vera Ivleva - weaver
Nina Belyaeva - cook
Victor Kolpakov - 1st deacon
Yury Chekulaev - sleeping man
Valery Nosik - servant
Grigory Shpigel - governor
Evgeny Mayhrovsky - jester
Yakov Belenky - 1st ship-master
Boris Bityukov - 2nd ship-master / 1st boyar
Sergei Golovanov - 3rd ship-master
Alexander Degtyar - 4th ship-master
Artem Karapetyan - 5th ship-master
Yury Kireev - 6th ship-master
Grigory Mikhaylov - 7th ship-master
Mikhail Orlov - 8th ship-master
Dmitry Orlovsky - 9th ship-master
Gurgen Tonunts - 10th ship-master
Vladimir Ferapontov - 11th ship-master

References

External links

1960s fantasy films
Films based on works by Aleksandr Pushkin
Films based on Russian folklore
Films based on Slavic mythology
Soviet fantasy films
Films based on fairy tales
1960s Russian-language films